Hopuhopu was a former New Zealand Army Camp in use from 1920 to 1989 and was located is  north of the town of Ngāruawāhia.

History 
From 1853 Hopuhopu was the site of a boys' mission school, which lost most of its pupils in 1862 and, by 1863, was reported as in disrepair, with the mission house burnt down in 1886.  With he construction of the Auckland to Te Awamutu  leg of the North Island Main trunk Line in the 1870s, the land that Hopuhopu occupied was passed into the possession of the New Zealand Railway Department.

Acquired by the Defence Department in 1920 in exchange for defence land at Frankton Junction.  Hopuhopu was to become the site of the Northern Command Mobilisation Depot.   Hopuhopu was used as a tented camp for Territorial army training throughout the 1920s whilst construction of the permanent infrastructure was undertaken with the first buildings handed over and taken into use during 1927, with final construction completed in August 1929 at a cost of £130,000 (2019 NZD$12,845,552.24). At the time, the camp was the most modern Military camp in New Zealand.

Hopuhopu served in its intended role as a mobilisation camp in 1939/40, as elements of the 2nd New Zealand Expeditionary Force Mobilised at Hopuhopu for overseas service.

Hopuhopu remained as an active military camp until 1989, where as part of number of base closures across the New Zealand Defence Force, Hopuhopu ceased to be an active military camp.

In 1993 the camp was returned to Waikato-Tainui, who converted it to their headquarters and Waikato-Tainui College for Research and Development.

Alternative Names 
Hopuhopu was the accepted name in general usage for the camp, but up to the 1940s the name Wakato Camp was also in common usage. Due to Hopuhopu's proximity to Ngāruawāhia it was also often referred to as 'Ngaruawahia Camp'.

See also

 Burnham Camp
 Linton Military Camp
 Papakura Military Camp
 Trentham Military Camp
 Waiouru Military Camp

References 

Military installations of New Zealand
Installations of the New Zealand Army
Buildings and structures in Waikato